The 2019 Indian Open was a professional snooker tournament. It was due to take place between 18 and 22 September 2018 at the Grand Hyatt Kochi Bolgatty in Kochi, India but was postponed due to the 2018 Kerala floods. The rescheduled Indian Open was played in Kochi from 27 February to 3 March 2019. It was the fifteenth ranking event of the 2018/2019 season.

Qualifying took place on 15 and 16 August 2018 in Preston, England.

John Higgins was the defending champion, having beaten Anthony McGill 5–1 in the 2017 final, but he lost to Matthew Selt in the semi-finals.

Selt went on to win his first ranking title, beating Lyu Haotian 5–3 in the final.

Zhou Yuelong made the first maximum break of his career in the fourth frame of his first round loss to Lyu Haotian. It was the 150th maximum in professional events.

Prize fund
The breakdown of prize money for this year is shown below:

 Winner: £50,000
 Runner-up: £25,000
 Semi-final: £15,000
 Quarter-final: £10,000
 Last 16: £6,000
 Last 32: £4,000
 Last 64: £2,000

 Televised highest break: £2,000
 Total: £323,000

The "rolling 147 prize" for a maximum break: £10,000

Main draw

Final

Qualifying
These matches were held between 15 and 16 August 2018 at the Preston Guild Hall in Preston, England. All matches were best of 7 frames.

Notes

Century breaks

Main stage centuries
There were a total of 33 century breaks made during the tournament. Zhou Yuelong made a century in a held over match.

 147, 102  Zhou Yuelong
 140  Mark Davis
 140  Zhao Xintong 
 137  Yuan Sijun
 136  Graeme Dott
 133  Andrew Higginson
 132  Scott Donaldson
 130, 116, 109  Li Hang
 127, 113  Anthony Hamilton
 125  Joe Perry
 123  Stuart Bingham
 121, 104, 104  John Higgins
 120, 109, 101  Luca Brecel
 115, 114, 106  Lyu Haotian
 108  Peter Ebdon
 108  Shaun Murphy
 106, 103  Hossein Vafaei
 104  Sam Craigie
 103  Sam Baird
 103, 102  Matthew Selt
 102  Michael Holt

Qualifying stage centuries
There were a total of 10 century breaks made during the qualifying matches preceding the event.

 135  Hamza Akbar
 122  Rod Lawler
 118  Joe Swail
 115  Lyu Haotian
 114  Ross Muir
 110  Oliver Lines
 102  Gerard Greene
 102  Michael Holt
 101  Stuart Bingham
 101  Elliot Slessor

References

2018
Indian Open
Indian Open (snooker)
Indian Open
Indian Open
Sport in Kochi